Ieva Dumbauskaitė (born 7 September 1994, in Klaipėda) is a Lithuanian beach volleyball player.

In 2013 Dumbauskaitė and Monika Povilaitytė became the first Lithuanian beach volleyball players to qualify for the world championships. In 2014 the two were nominated for Best Female Team of the Year at the Lithuanian Sportsperson of the Year awards, but lost to the rowers Milda Valčiukaitė and Donata Vištartaitė.

References

External links
 

1994 births
Living people
Lithuanian beach volleyball players
Women's beach volleyball players
Beach volleyball players at the 2015 European Games
European Games medalists in beach volleyball
European Games bronze medalists for Lithuania